Ramiz Abbasli (born July 1, 1948) is an Azerbaijani author, translator of fiction.

Biography 
Ramiz Abbasli(birth name Barkhudarov Ramiz Mohammad) was born in the Village of Papravend of the Agdam Rayon of the Republik of Azerbaijan on Juli 1.1948. His father was a teacher, he taught literary. His mother was a housewife. Ramiz Abbasli had gone to the eight-year school of the native village and then to the Boyahmedli Village upper school. He was very fond of the exact sciences – mathematics, physics and chemistry. He showed a keen interest in music, painted, read the fiction: Azerbijani tails, dastans, particulyarly he liked the epos “Koroghlu”. He read the works of M.Twain, J.Verne, V.Hugo, I.Turgenev, L.Boussenard, etc. He obtained a higher education in the Baku State University, went to the Department of Chemistry. In the student days he began to read more, wrote verses, stories. For a long time he worked as engineer in the SOCAR oil company. Combining the work of an engineer and a writer, he was quite successfully engaged in creative activities. Currently retired and working nowhere.

He is married and has two children.

Oeuvre 
Ramiz Abbasli is bilingual writer, writing in Azerbaijani and Russian. He translates the fiction from English, German and Russian. The story “The School of Seven Villages” (1996) made R.Abbasli a celebrity; for this story in 1996, the author received the award “Creative Success”. The connoisseurs of literature highly appreciated this interesting and dramatic tale in a short time, it had become a go-to book for many readers. Later it had been published the books “Mirage” (2000), “Dark Nights” (2008). 

The next book – “The name of the Thief” (2015) – has become a new whole stage in the creative activity of Ramiz Abbasli. The hero of this novel is not a man, but historical truth. Terrible events took place in Azerbaijan in the XX century. None of other nations has suffered the disaster which Azerbaijan people did. None of other nations babies have been burned to death by their parents eyes, none nations pregnant brides have not been torn their bellies with the bayonets and pushed their infants mudding them the soil. This Armenian bestiality was so widespread that it was brought forward for discussion in Russian State Duma early in the twentieth century. And This went on for exactly one hundred years; hundreds of thousands Azerbaijanis were exterminated. – In the book “The name of the Thief” it is written about it. The Azerbaijan people welcomed this work with love. It is believed that this is the best book written on Karabakh theme. The authors consider that this beautiful work is understandable, every Azerbaijani should read it, this book can even be used as a textbook in the universities and colleges.

R.Abbasli often touches on the issue of the writers relationship to society. His articles “Death of Andrii”, “Criticizm of the Wrong Review”, and the novel “Chimera” devoted to this issue.

İn the penultimate book of R.Abbasli “On an uninhabited peninsula” (Moscow – 2021) includes short stories written in Russian. This book is from “Golden Word” series, – the title itself says a lot. Drawing portraits of his compatriots with an experienced pen, R.Abbasli seeks through a short story to display the full gamut of human feelings: jealous and love, friendship and rivalry, grief and joy, despair and hope, The short story holds a special place in his work. Continuing the traditions of the classics of world literary, R.Abbasli achieved significant success in this most difficult genre of prose. Of special note is the structure of these stories, in this respect, the writer seeks to achieve what no one before him has been able to achieve, the ideal form of verbal art. His story “The First Returner” is estimated as the pinnacle of human wisdom. 
 
The story “The Song of the Blind Man” was written in 2019. This story describes, or rather, masterfully draws a real picture of the occupied and completely destroyed Azerbaijani settlement. This story was published in many almanacs and was included in both books of the author, published in Moscow, and as the best example of the modern prose, translated into English, published in the journal “Literary magazine” and distributed through the world. According to the critics, the stories of Ramiz Abbasli are modern, unique and truly majestic in their attention to detail, depth of feelings and unusual plat; this is a new prose, a new view of the world.

The last book “Nizami Gangavi Turkic Poet” (Baku – 2021) of the writer Ramiz Abbasli is dedicated to the 880th anniversary of Azerbaijani Poet Nizami Ganjevi. But this is not fiction, this is scientific research. Unfortunately, today there are attempts to present Nizami Ganjavi as a Persian Poet and classic of Iranian literature. However, this is a completely unfounded opinion; it is not science but pseudoscience: Nizami Ganjavi has nothing to do with Persia or Persian Literature. The book “Nizami Ganjavi Turkic Poet” is dedicated to this topic; R.Abbasli in his characteristic manner based solely on irrefutable facts, proves that Nizami Ganjavi is a Turkic poet.

Translations  
Translations of fiction takes special place in the creative life of Ramiz Abbasli. His translations have appeared since the 1990s. A false method of translating fiction was formed in Azerbaijan in Soviet period. Mostly they did translations not from the original, but from the Russian. R.Abbasli strongly criticized this technique and its supporters in his articles and interviews. He translated: the stories J. Joyce, A. Koppard, K. Mansfield, Galsworthy, Kafka, Hemingway, Sh. Anderson, H. Bell, I. Bachmann, J. Updike, D.K. Oates; the poems of Yeats, Roetke, Snyder; the plays of Yelinek, Pinter; the novels of Golding and Dickens. Ramiz Abbasli is the author of seven translated books, which include novels of English writers A Tale of Two Cities, Lord of the Flies and The Inheritors, the children's book Jip and Janneke of Norwegian writer Anna Schmidt, dozens of stories by European and American writers. All these works have been translated into Azerbaijani for the first time. His translations were published in all newspapers and magazines of Azerbaijan. Each of his translations was accompanied by an article with an unusually beautiful title: “The Bright Star of postmodern literature – John Updike”, “Great writer of the world – James Joyce”, “Master of English Parable William Golding”, etc. For many years, translating fiction from English, German and Russian, R.Abbasli brings the Azerbaijani Reader closer to world literature and he has done a lot in this imported matter.

Awards
Ramiz Abbasli was awarded with Order of Saint Anne (Russian Federation) on 27 November 2021 for his great Achievement in Literature.

Works

Books 
 “School of Seven Villages” – story collection. “Sabah” Publishing House. Baku – 1996;
 “Mirage” – novel. “Elm” Publishing House, Baku – 2000;
 “Dark nights” – novel, stories and short stories. “Nargiz” Publishing House, Baku – 2008;
 “The name of the thief”- novel. “Elm və təhsil” Publishing House, Baku – 2015;
 "Khimera" – novel. “Qanun” Publishing House, Baku – 2018;
 “Song of the Blind Man” – short story collection. Moscow – 2021;
 “Nizami Ganjavi Turkic Poet” – scientific research. “Qanun” Publishing House. Baku – 2021;
 “On an uninhabited peninsula” – short story collection. Moscow – 2021.

Novels 
 Agony,
 Mirage,
 The Name of the Thief,
 Chimera.

Narratives 
 School of Seven Villages,
 Aras Enamored with Kura,
 Dark Nights.

Stories 
 Summer Day;
 Gardens after Harvesting;
 Cord Wood;
 Self-justification;
 Scarlet Rose Petals;
 Evening Bazaar;
 Interview;
 A Woman by the Sea;
 Thermos with Cold Tea;
 The ninth place (in Russian);
 The unnamed boy (in Russian);
 Full house (in Russian);
 Temple on Maunt Badri (in Russian);
 Song of the Blind Man (in Russian);
 Poisened coffee (in Russian);
 First returner (in Russian);
 There, in Kremenchug (in Russian);
 Rookie Brigade (in Russian)
 On an uninhabited peninsula (in Russian).

Articles 
 Princess of Modern Literature – Magazine “Azerbaican”, 2005, vol.5;
 About the grossest falsifications in the book “The Black Garden” by Thomas de Vaal”. Almanac “Karabach: yesterday, today and tomorrow”; Baku-2010;
 Indefference to folk music, disrespekt to mother language. Magazine – “Gobustan”, 2010, vol.4;
 “Simbolizm” – sayt “azyb.az” – 2015;
 Master of the English Parabla – in the book “A tale of two Cities” by Charles Dickens (in Azerbaijani). Baku – 2017;
 The bright star of Postmodernist Literature – Cohn Updike. Newspaper “Ədəbiyyat qəzeti”, August 15, 2015;
 The patriarch of postmodernism – Cohn Bart. Newspaper “Ədəbiyyat qəzeti”, August 29, 2015;
 European postmodernism – Great Britain. Muriel Spark; “Ədəbiyyat qəzeti”, November 14, 2015; 
 European postmodernism – Great Britain. William Golding. “Ədəbiyyat qəzeti”, November 21, 2015;
 Genocide in Umudlu. The Papravend Battle. – 2017 (in Azerbaijani);
 Papravend Village. – 2017 (in Azerbaijani);
 Anninsky’s unwept pain. – 2017 (in Azerbaijani); in the book “Песня слепого”, by Ramiz Abbasli. Moscow – 2019;
 Научное исследование или фальсификация истории – 2017 (in Russian); in the book “Песня слепого” by Ramiz Abbasli. Moscow – 2019;
 The scientific study or history rewriting – 2018 (in English);
 Смерть Андрия. In the book “Песня слепого” by R.Abbasli. Moscow – 2019;
 Об Азербайджане. Сборник “Вокруг света” (in Russian). Moscow – 2021, №1;
 Азербайджан – жемчужина Кавказа. Сборник “Вокруг света” (in Russian). Moscow – 2020 №2;
 The Great writer of the world (in Azerbaijani). Newspaper “Yeni Azerbaijan”, February 22, 2002;
 The great masters of the short story (in Azerbaijani). Newspaper “Yeni Azerbaijan”, November 01, 2002;
 A writer who knew how to write the words of the people. In the book “A Tale of two Cities” by Charles Dickens (in Azerbaijani). Baku – 2017.

Translations 
 John Galsworthy, Acme (short story). Magazine “Ulduz”, vol.1;
 James Joyce. The Dead (story), Eveline (short story). Magazine “Dünya ədəbiyyatı”, 2005, Vol. 1, pp. 3-38.
 James Joyce. İvy Day in the Committee Room (short story). Newspaper “Yeni Azərbaycan”, February 22, 2002, April 5, 2002.
 James Joyce. Araby (short story). Magazine “Ulduz”, 2006, Vol. 5, pp. 58-61.
 Ingeborg Bachmann. Your word (poem); Shadows, Roses Shadows (poem), Magazine “Ulduz”, 2006, Vol. 1, p. 68.
 Ingeborg Bachmann. Death will come (short story). Magazine “Ulduz”, 2006, Vol. 1, pp. 58-61.
 Donald Bisset. Magic dream tree (tale); River of words (tale). Magazine “Ulduz”, 2000, Vol. 2, p. 51.
 Kathrine Mansfield. The wind blows (short story). Magazine “Ulduz”, 2008, Vol. 8, pp. 75-77.
 Kathrine Mansfield. A cup of tea (short story). Newspaper “Yeni Azərbaycan”, 02.03.2003.
 Muriel Spark. The very fine clock (short story). Magazine “Ulduz”, 1998, Vol. 10, pp. 62-63.
 Muriel Spark. If you were see waht’s happening there (short story). Newspaper “Ədəbiyyat qəzeti”, October 14, 2015.
 Alfred Coppard. Debt (short story). Magazine “Ulduz”, 1998, Vol. 10, pp. 64-68.
 Joyce Carol Oats. Where have you been, where are you going? (short story). Newspaper “Ədəbiyyat qəzeti”, October 17, 24, 31, and November 7, 2015.
 John Updike. Walter Briggs (short story). Newspaper “Ədəbiyyat qəzeti”, August 15, 2015.
 Cristopher Rid and others. The literature of feebleness (essay). Newspaper “Ədəbiyyat qəzeti”, August 29, 2015.
 Gary Snyder. Riprap (poem). Newspaper “Ədəbiyyat qəzeti”, October 10, 2015.
 Svetlana Alexievich. We’ll shoot at who cry (short story); I’m crying (short story); I was firing (short story); Mother cried: It wasn’t my daughter (short story). Newspaper “Ədəbiyyat qəzeti”, October 24, 2015.
 Franz Kafka. I was a Guest of the Dead (short story). Newspaper “Yeni Azərbaycan”, October 25, 2002.
 Franz Kafka. A Fratricide (short story). Newspaper “Yeni Azərbaycan”, February 09, 2003.
 Franz Kafka. Coal-miner (short story). Newspaper “Ədalət”, April 25, 2003.
 Franz Kafka. Dreaming (short story). Newspaper “Kaspi”, August 13, 2003.
 Friedrich Nietzsche. A Madman (essay). Newspaper “Ədalət”, September 25, 2003.
 Heinrich Böll. My expensive leg (short story). Newspaper “Yeni Azərbaycan”, August 27, 2002.
 Heinrich Böll. The deads disobey the order (short story). Newspaper “Yeni Azərbaycan”, October 4, 2002.
 Heinrich Böll. Street show (short story). Newspaper “Kaspi”, January 22, 2003.
 Elfriede Jelinek. Paula (short story). Magazine “Ulduz”, 2005, Vol. 2, pp. 42-45.
 Elfriede Jelinek. My dears (short story). Magazine “Azərbaycan”, 2005, Vol. 6, pp. 141-142.
 Elfriede Jelinek. Girl and death (play). Magazine “Dünya ədəbiyyatı”, 2005, Vol. 2, pp. 66-72.
 Sherwood Anderson. Departure (short story). Newspaper “Yeni Azərbaycan”, October 1, 2002.
 Helmut Haysenbuttel. Water painter (short story). Newspaper “Ədalət”, October 31, 2003.
 Harold Pinter. Poems: God blesses America; Democracy; Weather forecast; Death. Magazine “Ulduz”, 2006, Vol. 4, pp. 76-77.
 Harold Pinter. Uncommunicative waiter (play). Magazine “Ulduz”, 2006, Vol. 4, pp. 77-87.
 Rachel Hutmacher. Escape (short story). Mewspaper “Yeni Azərbaycan”, April 13, 2003.
 Ludwig Pels. Home (short story). Newspaper “Yeni Azərbaycan”, October 18, 2002.
 Katheline Foyle. My fife-player elephant (tale-short story). Newspaper “Yeni Azərbaycan”, 24. 09. 2003.
 James Barry. Peter Pen (tale-short story). Newspaper “Ədalət”, June 13, 2003.
 Helen Simpson. Tree (short story). Magazine “Ulduz”, 2004, Vol. 11, pp. 43-46.
 Ernest Hemingway. Indian Camp (short story). Magazine “Ulduz”, 1999, Vol. 7/8, pp. 64-66.
 Ernest Hemingway. Cat in the rain (short story). Magazine “Ulduz”, 1999, Vol. 7/8, pp. 67-68.
 Ernest Hemingway. Old man on the bridge (short story). Newspaper “İki sahil”, August 18, 1999.
 Gram Green. Special duties (short story). Newspaper “Yeni Azərbaycan”, September 24, 2001.
 William Butler Yeats. Poems: The Dolls; Wild Swans at Coole; To Ann Gregory; website “azyb.az”.
 John Steinbeck. “Chrysanthemum” (short story). Magazine “Azərbaycan”, 2008, Vol. 2, pp. 103-109.
 Maron Monica. Animal passion (short story). Magazine “Ulduz”, 2005, Vol. 11, pp. 75-77.
 Hew Lofting. Tale of Doctor Dulitll (short story). Magazine “Ulduz”, 2002, Vol. 2, pp. 52-54.
 Theodor Roethke, Poems, Magazine “Ulduz”, 2005, Vol. 9, pp. 86-88.
 William Golding. Selected works: William Golding’s Nobel Speech, pp. 13-27; Lord of the flies (novel), pp. 30-262; The İnheritors (novel), pp. 266-468. “Sharg-Garb” Publishing House, Baku – 2010.
 James Joyce “The Dubliners” – stories (with Alisa Nijat), “Ganun” Publishing House, Baku – 2011.
 Gary Snyder – poems; Magazine “Ulduz”, № 3, 2017
 Charles Dickens “A Tale of two cities”, “Ganun” Publishing House, Baku – 2018;
 William Golding “Lord of the flies” (novel), “Ganun” Publishing House, Baku – 2017;
 Anna Schmidt “Jip and Janneke”, “Ganun” Publishing, Baku – 2018.

Works in English translation
 The book “Nizami Ganjavi Turkic Poet”, Baku – 2021;
 Song of the Blind Man (short story) – Literary magazine “Russian Bell”, vol.4, Moscow – 2020; 
 The scientific study or history reüritinf, – Ramiz Abbasli answered Jost Gipert. Internet Archive.

References

External links

 Azerbaijani writers of the XX century. Encyclopedik reference book. Baku-2004 (in Azerbaijani);
 С.Алиева, Е.Малахова. "Шедевры мировой литературы на азербайджанском языке", Зеркало. – 2010. – 20 февраля. – С. 22.
 Вокруг света. Сборник. Москва – 2020, №1;
 Российский колокол. Литературная премия им.М.Ю.Лермонтова. Москва – 2019;
 Books by Ramiz Abbasli.

1948 births
Living people
Azerbaijani translators
21st-century translators
Azerbaijani-language writers
Baku State University alumni